Bucktail is an unincorporated community in Arthur County, Nebraska, United States.  Its elevation is 3,497 feet (1,066 m), and it is located at  (41.5649908, -101.43044877).

References

Unincorporated communities in Arthur County, Nebraska
Unincorporated communities in Nebraska